Antonio Esposito (born 4 May 2000) is an Italian professional footballer who plays as a left back for  club Latina on loan from Renate.

Club career
Formed in Frosinone youth system, Esposito made his senior debut for Serie D club Monterosi, in 2019–20 season on loan.

In 2020 he joined Renate.

On 15 July 2022, Esposito moved to Latina on loan.

References

External links
 
 

2000 births
Living people
Footballers from Naples
Italian footballers
Association football fullbacks
Serie C players
Serie D players
Frosinone Calcio players
A.C. Renate players
Latina Calcio 1932 players